Sherbet's Greatest Hits (1970–1975) was a compilation album released on Infinity Records in Australia in July 1975, at the height of Sherbet's popularity in Australia. It spent 1 week at the top of the Australian album chart in 1975. 

It was Sherbet's first number one album in Australia and covered their single releases 1970–1975. The liner notes gave track-to-track information.

Track listing

Chart positions

Weekly charts

Year-end charts

Personnel 

 Bass, vocals – Tony Mitchell
 Drums – Alan Sandow
 Guitar, vocals – Clive Shakespeare
 Keyboards, vocals – Garth Porter
 Lead vocals – Daryl Braithwaite

Release history

References

Sherbet (band) compilation albums
1975 greatest hits albums
Festival Records compilation albums
Infinity Records albums
Albums produced by Pat Aulton
Albums produced by Richard Batchens
Albums produced by Clive Shakespeare
Albums produced by Garth Porter